Alfonso Garcia (born 24 October 1969) is a Spanish former footballer. He played all of his career in Germany, including two seasons in the Bundesliga with SpVgg Unterhaching.

References

Living people
1969 births
Association football forwards
Spanish footballers
SpVgg Unterhaching players
SSV Reutlingen 05 players
Bundesliga players
2. Bundesliga players